The Yazoo County School District (YCSD) is a public school district headquartered in unincorporated Yazoo County, Mississippi (USA), near Yazoo City.

The district serves areas of Yazoo County not in the Yazoo City city limits; its area includes the town of Bentonia, the village of Satartia, the census-designated place of Benton, the unincorporated area of Eden, and rural areas.

The district previously had its headquarters within the Yazoo City city limits.

Schools
All schools are in unincorporated areas.
Yazoo County High School
Yazoo County Middle School
Bentonia Gibbs Elementary School (Bentonia)
Linwood Elementary School (Vaughan)

Demographics

2007-08 school year
There were a total of 1,763 students enrolled in the Yazoo County School District during the 2007–2008 school year. The gender makeup of the district was 48% female and 52% male. The racial makeup of the district was 52.13% African American, 47.14% White, 0.28% Hispanic, and 0.44% Asian.

Previous school years

Accountability statistics

School uniforms
All students are required to wear school uniforms.

See also
List of school districts in Mississippi

References

External links

Education in Yazoo County, Mississippi
School districts in Mississippi